Undine is an opera, with spoken dialogue, in three acts by the German composer and author E. T. A. Hoffmann. The libretto, by Friedrich de la Motte Fouqué, is based on his own story Undine. It received its premiere at the Königliches Schauspielhaus in Berlin on 3 August 1816. Undine was Hoffmann's greatest operatic success and a major influence on the development of German Romantic opera.

Carl Maria von Weber's enthusiastic review of the opera admired it as "an art work complete in itself, in which partial contributions of the related and collaborating arts blend together, disappear, and, in disappearing, somehow form a new world".

It was revived by the Wuppertal Opera in 1970.

There is a 1960 recording (including the spoken dialogue) by the Choir and Symphony Orchestra of the Bavarian Radio, conductor: Jan Koetsier, Undine: Rita Streich, Hulbrand von Ringstetten: Raimund Grumbach, Berthalda: Melitta Muszely, Kuhleborn: Karl-Christian Kohn, Ein alter Fischer: Max Proebstl, Seine Frau: Sunhild Rauschkolb, Heilmann: Kieth Engen, Herzog: Anton Rosner, Herzogin: Marjorie Heistermann; and a 3 CDs 1993 recording (leaving out the spoken dialogue) by the Berlin Radio Symphony Orchestra and the Choir of St. Hedwig's Cathedral in Berlin, conductor: Roland Bader; Roland Hermann, Elisabeth Glauser, Krisztina Laki, Heikki Orama, Karl Ridderbusch, Ulrich Ress, Dora Koschak, Mani Mekler.

Roles

Notes

External links
 
 Arien und Gesänge der Zauber-Oper genannt: Undine (libretto, Berlin 1816) – via Bavarian State Library

Romantische Opern
German-language operas
1816 operas
Operas
Opera world premieres at the Berlin State Opera
Works by E. T. A. Hoffmann
Works based on Undine (novella)
Operas based on novels